The 2011 Southeast Asian Games, officially known as the 26th Southeast Asian Games, or the 26th SEA Games, and commonly known as Jakarta-Palembang 2011, was a Southeast Asian multi-sport event held from 11 to 22 November 2011 in Jakarta and Palembang, Indonesia. It was Indonesia's fourth time to host the Southeast Asian Games, and its first since 1997. Previously, Indonesia also hosted in 1979 and 1987. The capital city of Jakarta hosted all three of the previous Games prior to this. Palembang became the third SEA Games non-capital host city, after Chiang Mai (1995) and Nakhon Ratchasima (2007), both in Thailand. Around 5,965 athletes from 11 participating nations participated at the games which featured 545 events in 44 sports. The biggest competitor, sports, and events in Southeast Asian Games history.

The games was held  from 11 to 22 November 2011, although several events had commenced from 3 November 2011. The games was opened by Susilo Bambang Yudhoyono, the President of Indonesia at the Gelora Sriwijaya Stadium in Palembang.

The final medal tally was led by host Indonesia, followed by Thailand and Vietnam, while Timor-Leste won its first ever Southeast Asian Games gold medal. Several Games and national records were broken during the games. Although there were several controversies, the Games were deemed generally successful with its promotion for conservative effort on endangered fauna species namely the komodo dragon through the mascot and with the rising standard of competition amongst the Southeast Asian nations.

Despite not held in the capital city Jakarta, but the opening ceremony in this edition was dubbed by international media from around the world as the most magnificent, luxurious, and spectacular opening ceremony in Southeast Asian Games history with special showcase of lightning and gigantic fireworks. Washington Post USA and The Guardian UK November edition make this opening ceremony as their newspaper headlines. The 26th SEA Games opening ceremony in Palembang was the first SEA Games to utilise spider camera, large LED screen and large-format projection technology provided by Australian-based Electric Canvas. The mass dance performance featured "The Glory of Srivijaya" as the theme.

Organisation

Host city

Palembang, the capital city of South Sumatra was the main host of the games, while the nation's capital Jakarta was the co-host.
As the main host, Palembang only held 22 of 42 sports, the rest was held by the co-host city. Palembang also hosted the opening and closing ceremonies.

Initially, the government had named four provinces as candidates to host the SEA Games 2011, namely Jakarta, West Java, Central Java, and South Sumatra. However this idea has been discarded and hosting rights was granted to only two provinces, Jakarta and South Sumatra. President Susilo Bambang Yudhoyono had suggested that this could simplify hosting and organization while reducing costs.

Development and preparation
INASOC was the organising body for the games. The President of INASOC was Rita Subowo, who is also the then-President of the Indonesia Olympic Committee, with Rahmat Gobel, an entrepreneur and the President of Panasonic Gobel Indonesia, its director-general. The Indonesian government budget of 2010 gave a total of 350 billion rupiahs (≈US$38.7 million) for the games, while the budget of 2011 gave a total of 2.1 trillion rupiahs (≈US$230 million). According to the Indonesian Minister of Youth and Sports Andi Mallarangeng, the government of Indonesia added 1 trillion rupiahs (± US$110 million) from the government budget for the games, including 600 billion from the budget for the education sector and funds from sponsorship. The government of South Sumatra declared its commitment to incorporate eco-policies with the games. All venues during the games are smoke-free. Palembang, as the first city outside Jakarta to host the SEA Games, faced some environmental problems due to development for the games.

Venues
Venues in Palembang

Venues in Jakarta

Venues in West Java (Including Greater Jakarta)

Athletes' village
Located near Palembang, Jakabaring was the athletes' village (wisma atlet) during the games. It covered an area of more than 45,000 square metres. It is located in front of Jakabaring Stadium (Gelora Sriwijaya).

Public transport
To prepare for athletes, officials and visitors during the games, several significant changes are being done in both host cities. Palembang doubled the size of its Sultan Mahmud Badaruddin II Airport. Nowadays, the airport is served by only seven airlines and served only three other ASEAN countries: Singapore, Malaysia and Thailand. INASOC improved the number of flights, especially connecting flights from Jakarta and Singapore to Palembang and also eased charter flights from other SEA Games participating countries. The South Sumatran Office of Transportation, Communication and Information provided a total of 40 buses, 100 midibuses, 300 minibuses and 100 motorcycles for the athletes, officials and journalists. Besides, a bus rapid transit system, Trans Musi, served Palembang and surrounding regencies of Ogan Ilir and Banyuasin.

On 31 December 2010, Jakarta's bus rapid transit system, TransJakarta, opened its newest two corridors, Corridor 9 and 10, to serve the games.

Concerning traffic jams in Jakarta, police blocked trucks from the inner city toll road between 5:00 am and 10:00 pm. Only shuttle buses with certain stickers for the games were allowed to enter the games' two main venues.

Countdown
The official countdown to the games' opening ceremony started since 11 November 2010, marking a year before the games. The countdown clock is located nearby the Ampera Bridge, the landmark of Palembang.

Three hundred days before the opening ceremony, a special event showing Indonesian art performances and featuring a number of Indonesian famous celebrity was held at Teater Tanah Airku, Taman Mini Indonesia Indah, Jakarta. During the event, the official logo of the games was launched publicly. On 10 November 2010 in Palembang, Indonesian Minister of Sport and Youth begin a year countdown to SEA Games opening.

Torch relay
A torch relay was held; the flame for SEA Games was taken from Desa Mrapen, Purwodadi in the province of Central Java. The flame from Merapen was also used for 2008 Asian Beach Games and 1997 Southeast Asian Games torch relays. The relay started in Purwodadi and arrived in Palembang on 11 November 2011. It traveled through several Indonesian provinces before it followed the route across 15 South Sumatran regencies. The torch was passed from 6 to 11 November through Borobudur, Yogyakarta, Semarang, Komodo Island and Kupang, Jayapura, Makassar, Balikpapan and Samarinda, Jakarta, and finished in Palembang, South Sumatera. The journey involved 45 torchbearers for every single leg of the relay.

Marketing

Logo

The official logo of the 2011 Southeast Asian Games is a Garuda image, which also the national symbol of Indonesia. The logo that depicts the philosophy of "Garuda flight above Indonesian nature". Physical appearance of Garuda represents strength, while its wings epitomises glory and splendor. The upper green strokes symbolise the islands, forests, and mountainous terrain of the Indonesian archipelago, while the blue strokes epitomises the vast Nusantara ocean which unifies differences. Land and water or  Tanah Air in Indonesian means homeland. The red strokes represent courage, zeal, and burning passion to give the best for the country. This logo was introduced during SEA Games Preparation Ministerial Meeting in Jakarta, 3 December 2010, and launched to the public in a celebration of 300 days before the opening ceremony, 15 January 2011 at Teater Tanah Airku, Taman Mini Indonesia Indah.

Mascot
The official mascots of the 2011 Southeast Asian Games are a pair of Komodo dragons named  Modo and Modi. Modo is a male Komodo dragon wearing a blue traditional Indonesian costume and a batik sarong, while Modi is a female Komodo dragon wearing a red kebaya with a batik sash and pants. The mascots were adopted from Komodo dragons, an endemic Indonesian fauna native to Komodo, Rinca, and Padar islands in East Nusa Tenggara. The mascots were introduced and launched 200 days before the SEA Games XXVI, on Monday 25 April 2011 in three places: in Jakarta, Tanah Airku Theatre in Taman Mini Indonesia Indah and Selamat Datang Monument in Central Jakarta. "Modo" is a short name for Komodo, while "Modo-Modi" is a modified spelling of Muda-Mudi which means "youth" in Indonesian language, derived from pemuda (male youth) and pemudi (female youth).

Previously, the government of Palembang had chosen the Sumatran elephant as the mascot through an open contest, but there was a suggestion from President Susilo Bambang Yudhoyono and the National Sports Committee of Indonesia to use rajawali instead. The rajawali is an Indonesian hawk. Then both Sumatran elephants and Javan hawk-eagles were discarded in favour of Komodo dragons. The choosing of Komodo dragons for the Games' mascots was in line with an Indonesian effort to promote Komodo National Park as a New7Wonders of Nature candidate.

Songs
The 2011 Southeast Asian Games' first theme song, "Ayo Indonesia Bisa" (Come on, Indonesia, you can) was composed by Yovie Widianto and sung by vocalist Ello featuring Sherina Munaf duet vocalist pop music soloist, was the official theme anthem of the 2011 Southeast Asian Games. The second theme song "Kita Bisa" (We Can) was composed by Yovie Widianto and sung by Dudi Nuno, Dikta Nuno, Ello, Judika, Terry, Astrid and Lala Karmela (credited as Yovie and Friends). A music video of the second theme song, featuring the singers and Indonesian athletes and accompanied by the Victorian Phillaharmonic Orchestra was also released. At the closing ceremony, the song "Kita Bisa" was played just after the torch was extinguished.

The official theme song of the opening ceremony "Together We Will Shine" composed by Addie MS and Jozef Cleber was performed at the opening ceremony by Agnes Monica from Indonesia, Jaclyn Victor from Malaysia, and KC Concepcion from Philippines.

Sponsors

Prestige sponsors
 Garuda Indonesia
 Panasonic
 Indofood
 Unilever
 Clear
 Rexona
 Vaseline Men
 Indosat
 Samsung
 MNC Media
 Bank Mandiri
 Artha Graha Peduli

Others
 Plaza Senayan
 Oso Drinking Water
 Coca-Cola
 Milo
 Recapital
 Sultan Hotel
 Daihatsu
 Mitsubishi
 21 Cineplex
 AXA Mandiri

The Games

Opening ceremony

On 10 November 2011 (a day before opening ceremony) the Sea Games torch flame ceremony was held along Musi River in front of Kuto Besak fort. The opening ceremony officially began at 7:00 pm on 11 November 2011 in Gelora Sriwijaya Stadium. The date was chosen because its unique numbers of the date 11 November 2011 (11.11.11). The main event of opening ceremony with musical and dance performances and also parade of athletes of participating nations, were held in Gelora Sriwijaya Stadium.

The 26th SEA Games opening ceremony in Palembang was the first SEA Games to utilise spider camera, large LED screen and large-format projection technology provided by Australian-based Electric Canvas. The mass dance performance featured "The Glory of Srivijaya" as the theme.

Indra Yudhistira directed and concepted the opening ceremony with assistance by music director, Erwin Gutawa and choreographers such as Ari Tulang, Deddy Pudja, Hartati, and Alex Hassim, as well as percussionist Ade Rudiana. The Games' theme song, Together We'll Shine was sung by three Southeast Asian female singers, dubbed as Southeast Asian divas, Agnes Monica of Indonesia, Jaclyn Victor of Malaysia and KC Concepcion of the Philippines. Numerous other Indonesian singers was also given the spotlight during the ceremony. Unlike other opening ceremonies of previous games, Palembang presented an artistic vehicle parade and breathtaking theatrics in the lighting of the flame. The artistic vehicles represented the participating nations and featuring famous symbols and landmarks of each nations, such as Komodo and Borobudur float representing Indonesia, Wat Phra Kaew chedi and giant's head representing Thailand, Petronas towers and Putra Mosque representing Malaysia, and Angkor Bayon temple representing Cambodia. The national floats were leading in front of parading athletes of each respected countries. The parading athletes were accompanied by the traditional Indonesian musics from distinct archipelagic regions.

The eternal flame from Mrapen entered the stadium as a continuation of the Palembang torch relay leg from the outside. The Southeast Asian Games torch was relayed around the stadium by 4 athletes, and was finally passed on to Susi Susanti, 1992 Summer Olympics gold medalist in Badminton. Susi Susanti was later suspended by wires, carrying the torch and appeared to run horizontally along the stadium started from the ancient Srivijaya junk to the cauldron and attempted to lit the flame with the torch but failed. But fortunately though, at the final moment, a spotlight revealed the final resting place of the Southeast Asian Games flame, which had appeared during the torch run. A colossal torch situated at the top of the stadium was lit by a proportionately large Constructor. The 2011 Southeast Asian Games's second official theme song "Kita Bisa", composed by Addie MS, with lyrics by Jozef Cleber, was performed in the opening ceremony by Dudi Oris, Pradikta Wicaksono, Ello, Judika Nalon Abadi Sihotang, Terryana Fatiah, Astrid Sartiasari and Lala Karmela, accompanied by Victorian Philharmonic Orchestra.

Closing ceremony
The closing ceremony was held on 22 November 2011 at Gelora Sriwijaya Stadium. During the closing ceremony, Indonesia, the hosts and the overall champions of the games, passed the SEA Games Federation flag to Myanmar, the host of the next edition of the games. Lala Karmela performed the Southeast Asian Games song "Kita Bisa" just after the torch was extinguished.

Participating nations

 
 
  (host)

Sports

The 2011 Southeast Asian Games featured 545 events in 44 sports and disciplines, in which two of them are demonstration sports.

During the SEA Games Federation Council Meeting in Hotel Mulia, Jakarta, in May 2010, the SEAGF Sports and Rules Committee proposed three categories of sports to be competed in the games.

The meeting also increased the number of sport competed. Indonesia proposed to hold paragliding, wall climbing, roller skating, bridge, futsal and soft tennis. Although the other Southeast Asian countries proposed arnis, muay thai, hockey, netball, pétanque, squash, triathlon, Rugby union and cricket. For the record, hockey and squash were last competed at the 1997 edition in Jakarta.

 
 
 
 
 
 
 
 
 
 
 
 ¹
 ¹
 
 ³
 
 ¹
 
 
 
 
 
 
 
 ²
 

 
 
 
 Artistic
 Rhythmic
 Aerobic
 
 ¹
 ʰ
 ³
 ²
 ²
 ʰ
 
 
 ²
 
 °
 °
 
 
 
 ¹
 
 Beach
 Indoor
 ²
 ʰ
 ʰ
 
 
 ¹

Demonstration sports:
 Cricket
 Tarung Derajat – a Sundanese martial art

¹ – not an official Olympic Sport
² – sport played only in the SEAG
³ – not a traditional Olympic nor SEAG Sport and introduced only by the host country.
° – a former official Olympic Sport, not applied in previous host countries and was introduced only by the host country.
ʰ- sport not played in the previous edition and was reintroduced by the host country.

Calendar

Medal table
A total of 1,807 medals, comprising 554 gold medals, 549 silver medals, and 704 bronze medals were awarded to athletes. The Host Indonesia performance was their best ever yet in Southeast Asian Games history and emerged as overall champions of the games. Timor Leste claimed its first ever gold medal in the Southeast Asian Games in the sport of Shorinji Kempo, while Brunei is the only country this year that failed to capture any gold medal.

Key

Medal change
Malaysian sprinter Muhamad Yunus Lasaleh was tested positive for doping. Thus his relay team was stripped of the gold medal.

Concerns and controversies
At SEA Games Federation Meeting in Bali, February 2011, Malaysia appealed for the reinclusion of 60 dropped events, but then the federation rejected the appeal from Olympic Council of Malaysia. Datuk Zolkples Embong, the director-general of the council, said:

Controversial decision
The gold medal rewarded for Indonesian Dian Kristanto in the Class A Pencak Silat finals has raised criticisms from some countries, namely: Singapore, Thailand, and Vietnam. Singaporean Pencak Silat referee Jasni Salam and announced Kristanto the winner after he had bitten Anothai Choopeng.

Vietnam Television at late night gave a comment with quotation from Anothai Choopeng "Except Indonesian here every single body finds who is worth winning. I am truly disappointed with the behaviours from the set of referees. They always do everything to make the host country win."

See also
 2011 ASEAN Para Games
 2018 Asian Games

References

External links

 

 
Southeast Asian Games
Multi-sport events in Indonesia
Southeast Asian Games
Southeast Asian Games
Southeast Asian Games
International sports competitions hosted by Indonesia
Sport in Jakarta
Sport in Palembang
2010s in Jakarta